Marco Antonio Da Mula, known as cardinal Marcantonio Amulio (1506 in Venice – 13 or 17 March 1572, in Rome) was a Venetian ambassador and a cardinal of the Roman Catholic Church.

Marco Antonio Da Mula has been Venetian ambassador at the courts of Charles V (1552–54), Philip II (1559) and pope Pius IV (1560–61). This pope named him cardinal on 26 February 1561. He has been bishop of Rieti, member of the Holy Office and Cardinal Librarian of the Vatican Library.  He died in Rome on 17 March 1572.

While bishop, he was the principal consecrator of: Eugenio Camuzzi, Bishop of Bobbio (1569)

References

External links

1506 births
1572 deaths
16th-century Venetian people
16th-century Italian cardinals
Republic of Venice diplomats
Republic of Venice clergy
16th-century Italian Roman Catholic bishops
Italian librarians